Amir Hosseini (born 23 July 1975 in Mashhad) is a retired Iranian volleyball player who former played as a setter for the Iranian national team of the year 2002–2012.

Honours

National team
Asian Championship
Gold medal (1): 2011
Bronze medal (1):  2003
Asian Games
Silver medal (1): 2002

Club
World Championship
Bronze medal (1): 2010 (Paykan)

Iranian Super League
Champions (10)

Individual
Best Server: 2002 Asian Club Championship
Best Setter: 2004 Asian Club Championship
Best Setter: 2011 Asian Championship

References

External links
 www.fivb.org
 www.iranvolleyball.com
 www.scoresway.com

1975 births
Living people
Iranian men's volleyball players
Sportspeople from Mashhad
Asian Games silver medalists for Iran
Asian Games medalists in volleyball
Volleyball players at the 2002 Asian Games
Volleyball players at the 2006 Asian Games
Medalists at the 2002 Asian Games
Islamic Solidarity Games competitors for Iran